Fort Kent is a town in Aroostook County, Maine, United States, situated at the confluence of the Fish River and the Saint John River, on the border with New Brunswick, Canada. The population was 4,067 in the 2020 census. Fort Kent is home to an Olympic biathlete training center, an annual CAN-AM dogsled race, and the Fort Kent Blockhouse, built in reaction to the Aroostook War and in modern times designated a national historic site. Principal industries include agriculture (particularly potatoes and forestry) and textiles. Fort Kent is the northern terminus of U.S. 1 and the ending point of the Northern Forest Canoe Trail.

History
Fort Kent was erected in the summer of 1839 as an American border outpost during the undeclared Aroostook War. The blockhouse, the first structure built in what is the present-day city of Fort Kent, was named after then-governor of Maine Edward Kent. The Saint John River was a log driving route from upstream forests to downstream sawmills and paper mills until the Bangor and Aroostook Railroad and trucks began transporting pulpwood.

2008 flooding
Nearly two days of nonstop rain also contributed to the flooding. As the river rose, it poured into the downtown area. More than 600 of Fort Kent's 4,233 residents were evacuated.

Governor John Baldacci declared a state of emergency for the region, flying from Augusta to see the damage first-hand. The Fish River did most of the damage, flooding St. Louis Catholic church and an apartment building.

Relationship with French Canada
The town is economically and culturally linked to the Canadian towns of Clair and Saint-François-de-Madawaska, both in Madawaska County, New Brunswick, directly across the Saint John River. Most children on the Canadian side attend French-speaking school while their American counterparts are taught mainly in English.

Sixty-two percent of the residents of Fort Kent are habitual speakers of French. The variety of French spoken in Fort Kent and most of the Saint John River Valley closely resembles the French spoken in Quebec and New Brunswick. It is referred to as New England French, "Valley French", or "Brayon". Many residents have American-Canadian dual citizenship.

Geography

Climate
Fort Kent has a humid continental climate (Koppen: Dfb). There are four distinct seasons, with winter being the longest, typically beginning during November or late October and lasting well into April many years. Summers are very pleasant, with warm days and cool nights. Fort Kent receives a large amount of snowfall every year, averaging  of snow fall. On average, the last and first freeze dates are May 28 and September 17, giving Fort Kent an average growing season of 112 days.

Demographics

2010 census
As of the census of 2010, there were 4,097 people, 1,747 households, and 1,062 families living in the town. The racial makeup of the town was 94.9% White, 0.8% African American, 0.8% Native American, 0.7% Asian, 0.1% from other races, and 2.7% from two or more races. Hispanic or Latino of any race were 0.7% of the population.

There were 1,747 households, of which 25.8% had children under the age of 18 living with them, 49.5% were married couples living together, 8.0% had a female householder with no husband present, 3.4% had a male householder with no wife present, and 39.2% were non-families. 31.4% of all households were made up of individuals, and 13.6% had someone living alone who was 65 years of age or older. The average household size was 2.23 and the average family size was 2.83.

The median age in the town was 42.7 years. Of residents 19.9% were under the age of 18; 12.3% were between the ages of 18 and 24; 20.7% were from 25 to 44; 29.5% were from 45 to 64; and 17.6% were 65 years of age or older. The gender makeup of the town was 48.0% male and 52.0% female.

2000 census

As of the census of 2000, there were 4,233 people, 1,735 households, and 1,106 families living in the town. The racial makeup of the town was 96.95% White, 0.38% Black or African American, 0.76% Native American, 0.87% Asian, 0.28% from other races, and 0.76% from two or more races. Hispanic or Latino of any race were 0.50% of the population.

There were 1,735 households, out of which 28.2% had children under the age of 18 living with them, 54.0% were married couples living together, 6.7% had a female householder with no husband present, and 36.2% were non-families. Of all households 29.3% were made up of individuals, and 13.0% had someone living alone who was 65 years of age or older. The average household size was 2.34 and the average family size was 2.90.

In the town, the population was spread out, with 22.3% under the age of 18, 11.3% from 18 to 24, 26.9% from 25 to 44, 24.0% from 45 to 64, and 15.5% who were 65 years of age or older. The median age was 38 years. For every 100 females, there were 96.3 males. For every 100 females age 18 and over, there were 91.7 males.

The median income for a household in the town was $29,547, and the median income for a family was $41,616. Males had a median income of $35,325 versus $19,146 for females. The per capita income for the town was $16,403. About 9.5% of families and 14.5% of the population were below the poverty line, including 13.7% of those under age 18 and 18.2% of those age 65 or over.

Arts and culture

International Muskie Derby
Fort Kent is home to the International Muskie Fishing Derby. The Derby was started in 2003 to provide a platform showcase the new fishery and continues today. It has brought attention to the new fishery and helped bring attention to national TV shows such as ESPN 2's Beat Charlie Moore. This show and other future shows will help show case the fishery to not only potential derby contestants but for a more secure and expanded tourist based fishery. The St John Watershed is a unique muskie habitat. Several factors make it acceptable and necessary to remove some fish from the ecosystem for the fishery to remain healthy.

Ploye Festival
Along with the Muskie Derby is the Fort Kent Ploye Festival, one of the featured events is the making of the world's largest ploye. This event attracts hundreds of spectators, making it the highlight of the Ploye Festival. The massive ploye, which thus far, measures 12 feet in diameter, can only be accomplished with the help of friends and family of Bouchard Family Farm, producers or the ploye mix. It requires approximately fifteen bags of charcoal to ready the metal pan to the accurate temperature in order for the ploye to be cooked to perfection. It also needs about fifty pounds of ploye mix, much water (which is then mixed in five-gallon pails) and plenty of muscle to stir the mix. Five people are required to transport the mix from the pails to the awaiting pre-heated pan and also four people to spread the mix out as fast as possible. The thin batter cooks quickly, so time is of the essence. Once cooked, the enormous pan is then removed from the coals, and the ploye is taken off with huge spatulas. Pieces of the giant ploye are then plopped onto large trays and brought to nearby tables where they can be buttered with brushes, and distributed to the eagerly awaiting crowd.

World Cup IBU
The Fort Kent Outdoor Center (previously known as 10th Mountain) has hosted a multitude of World Cup biathlon events, including the largest events in 2004 and 2011, where racers from around the globe took part in various biathlon events in Fort Kent. During the 2011 World Cup Biathlon, Chicago Bulls superstar Scotty Pippen visited Fort Kent to witness the race. 2010–11 Biathlon World Cup – World Cup 8 The World Cup Biathlon will be returning to Northern Maine in 2023.

World Acadian Congress
Northern Maine and parts of New Brunswick and Quebec participated in the World Acadian Congress to celebrate the rich Acadians history of the area in 2014. Multiple family reunions and events took place during the time, including concerts, parades, and festivals.

Can Am Crown International Sled Dog Race
The Can-Am Crown International Sled Dog Race was first held on Tuesday, February 16, 1993. Nine teams from Maine, Ontario, Quebec, and New Brunswick competed in that race. In 1994 sixteen teams competed in the 250-mile race and eleven in the newly introduced 60-mile race. In 1997 a 30-mile race was added to the itinerary. That same year, the first Saturday in March was established as the official start date for all three races. The race begins on Main Street in Fort Kent, sloping underneath the international bridge to Canada, then extending into the western parts of the Allagash wilderness, and finishes back in Fort Kent. Three races are part of the CAN-AM Crown, consisting of a 30-mile, 60 mile, and an Iditarod Trail Sled Dog Race qualifying 250 mile race.

Education
Fort Kent is served by Maine School Administrative District 27. Schools in the town include Fort Kent Elementary School, Valley Rivers Middle School and Fort Kent Community High School.

The town is home to the campus of the University of Maine at Fort Kent.

Infrastructure

Transportation
Fort Kent signed a lease agreement with the Fish River Flying Club on July 8, 2011 to repair, maintain, and operate the local municipal airport, which had been closed since the 1980s.

Notable people
People born in Fort Kent:

 Benjamin Collings (born 1976), politician
 Mike Daisey (born 1976), monologist
 Clair Goodblood (1929-1951), recipient of the Medal of Honor
 Helen Hamlin (1917-2004), author
 Troy Dale Jackson (born 1968), politician
 Ellis Paul (born 1965), singer-songwriter
 Austin Theriault (born 1994), NASCAR driver and politician 
 Don Voisine (born 1952), abstract artist

References

External links

 Town of Fort Kent

 
French-Canadian culture in Maine
Populated places on the Saint John River (Bay of Fundy)
Towns in Aroostook County, Maine
Towns in Maine